D.A.R.K. is an alternative rock band formed in New York City in early 2009. It was initially founded under the name Jetlag by Olé Koretsky and former the Smiths bassist Andy Rourke. In April 2014, the band began recording new material with the Cranberries vocalist Dolores O'Riordan, and they subsequently changed their name to D.A.R.K. The album, titled Science Agrees, was released on September 9, 2016 through Cooking Vinyl. In 2017, Koretsky teamed with DJ Wool under the D.A.R.K. name to tour as an opening act for The Cranberries. O'Riordan died as a result of accidental drowning on January 15, 2018.

Discography
Science Agrees (9 September 2016)

References

External links
 

Alternative rock groups from New York (state)
Musical groups established in 2009
Musical groups from New York City